Smoker's face describes the characteristic changes that happen to the faces of many people who smoke.
The general appearance is of accelerated ageing of the face, with a characteristic pattern of facial wrinkling and sallow coloration.

A summary of a study published by the National Institutes of Health found that certain facial features appeared in about 46% of continuing smokers and 8% of former smokers who had smoked a full decade while those same features were absent in a control group of non-smokers.

References

Smoking
Human appearance
Medical signs
Health effects of tobacco